American actress Kate Hudson has received various awards and nominations throughout her career. In 2000, her role as Penny Lane in Cameron Crowe's drama film Almost Famous earned her worldwide recognition and critical plaudits, including nominations for an Academy Award (Oscar), a Golden Globe Award, a Satellite Award, a Critics' Choice Award and a Screen Actors Guild Award for Best Supporting Actress and a BAFTA Award for Best Actress; winning the Golden Globe and Satellite Award. In 2012, her role in the film was recognized as the second-best performance by an actress in a supporting role of the 2000s decade by the Awards Circuit Community.

Hudson has also received recognition for her roles in the films: How to Lose a Guy in 10 Days, Alex & Emma (both 2003), Raising Helen (2004), You, Me and Dupree (2006), Fool's Gold, My Best Friend's Girl (both 2008), Bride Wars, Nine (both 2009), Something Borrowed (2011), Wish I Was Here (2014), Mother's Day (2016), and Music (2021); with the latter garnering controversy around its misinterpretation of the autism community and earned both Hudson and her co-star Maddie Ziegler Golden Raspberry Awards for Worst Actress and Worst Supporting Actress, respectively. Simultaneously, Hudson garnered her second Golden Globe nomination for the same role. Her role in Nine earned Hudson and her co-stars the Satellite Award for Best Cast - Motion Picture and a SAG Award nomination in the same category.

Awards and nominations

References

Hudson, Kate